Peacock Alley was one of St. Louis's most important jazz clubs in the 1950s. It was located in the former Mill Creek Valley neighborhood at 2935 Lawton Boulevard (the street no longer exists). It was close to Union Station, so it was favored among musicians due to the proximity. The venue was initially opened in 1944 in the basement of Midtown Hotel as the Glass Bar. In 1955, the Glass Bar was remodeled and renamed to Peacock Alley. Some sources report that it was located in Gaslight Square, although this is incorrect. It attracted performances from Miles Davis, John Coltrane, the Chet Baker Quartet, J.J. Johnson, Max Roach, Kai Winding, Art Blakey and many others.

It closed in the 1960s.

See also
Gaslight Square, St. Louis

Sources
Miles and Me, Quincy Troupe. 
City of the Gabriels: The Jazz History of St. Louis, Dennis Owsley.

References

Jazz clubs in the United States
Music venues in St. Louis
Defunct jazz clubs in the United States